Alejandro Castillo is the name of:

Alejandro Castillo (criminal), American criminal
Alejandro Castillo (footballer), Mexican footballer